La chica del trébol is an album by Spanish singer and actress singer Rocío Dúrcal, released in 1964 as the soundtrack album of the 1963 film of the same name.

Track listing
 "Trébole"
 "Tilín, tilín"
 "Qué Ilusión"
 "Hay tantos chicos"
 "Camino de la felicidad"
 "Mucho más"
 "Tu carita"
 "Los piropos de mi barrio"
 "Canto para tí"

1964 albums
Rocío Dúrcal albums
Spanish-language albums